The men's 1500 metres event at the 1970 European Athletics Indoor Championships was held on 15 March in Vienna.

Medalists

Results

Heats
First 4 in each heat (Q) qualified directly for the final.

Final

References

1500 metres at the European Athletics Indoor Championships
1500